Elisabeth of Meissen, Burgravine of Nuremberg (22 November 1329 – 21 April 1375) was the daughter of Frederick II, Margrave of Meissen and Mathilde of Bavaria and a member of the House of Wettin.

Marriage and children
She was born in Wartburg.  On 7 September 1356, at the age of twenty six, she married Frederick V, Burgrave of Nuremberg in Jena. In 1357 her husband succeeded to the title, and from that time until her death in 1375, she was styled as Burgravine of Nuremberg. Together Frederick and Elisabeth had nine children, seven girls and two boys, who survived to adulthood:

 Elisabeth (1358–26 July 1411, Heidelberg), married in Amberg 1374 to Rupert of Germany.
 Beatrix (c. 1362, Nuremberg–10 June 1414, Perchtoldsdorf), married in Vienna 1375 Duke Albert III of Austria
 Anna (c. 1364–after 10 May 1392), a nun in Seusslitz.
 Agnes (1366 – 22 May 1432), Convent in Hof (1376–1386) married in Konstance 1386 Baron Friedrich of Daber, Returned to Convent in Hof (1406) Abbess in Hof (1411–1432).
 John (c. 1369–11 June 1420, Plassenburg).
 Frederick (1371–1440).
 Margarete (died 1406, Gudensberg), married in Kulmbach 1383 Landgrave Hermann of Hesse.
 Katharina (died 1409), Abbess in Hof.
 Veronica of Hohenzollern, married Barnim VI, Duke of Pomerania.

Elisabeth died at the age of 45.

References 

1329 births
1375 deaths
House of Wettin
House of Hohenzollern
People from Eisenach
Burials at Heilsbronn Abbey
14th-century German women
Daughters of monarchs